Sami Habib Beldi (born 23 September 1998), is an Algerian professional footballer who plays as a goalkeeper for Qatar Stars League side Umm Salal.

Career statistics

Club

References

External links
 

1997 births
Living people
Qatari footballers
Qatari people of Algerian descent
Naturalised citizens of Qatar
Association football goalkeepers
Lekhwiya SC players
Al-Duhail SC players
Umm Salal SC players
Qatar Stars League players